Toyama Prefectural General Sports Center is an arena in Toyama, Toyama, Japan. It is adjacent to Toyama Airport.

Facilities
Large arena  50m×36m
Medium arena 45m×30m
Swimming pool 50m 8 courses
Diving pool

References

External links
Homepage

Basketball venues in Japan
Indoor arenas in Japan
Toyama (city)
Sports venues in Toyama Prefecture
Swimming venues in Japan
Toyama Grouses
Sports venues completed in 1984
1984 establishments in Japan